Hungerford Park was a country house and surrounding estate in the English county of Berkshire, within the civil parish of Hungerford. It was demolished in 1958 or 1960.

It was an 18th-century building, substantially altered in 1934.

References

Houses completed in the 18th century
Country houses in Berkshire
Hungerford